= Bhadrapur, Dharwad =

Bhadrapur
- Village
- Country: India
- State: Karnataka
- District: Dharwad

Government
  - Type: Panchayat raj
  - Body: Gram panchayat

Population (2011)
  - Total: 3,524

Languages
  - Official: Kannada
- Time zone: UTC+5:30 (IST)
- ISO 3166 code: IN-KA
- Vehicle registration: KA
- Website: karnataka.gov.in

Bhadrapur, Dharwad is a village in Dharwad district of Karnataka, India.

== Demographics ==
At the 2011 census of India there were 714 households in Bhadrapur and a total population of 3,524 consisting of 1,787 males and 1,737 females. There were 444 children aged 0-6.
